Javid Imamverdiyev (born 1 August 1990 in Shamkir) is an Azerbaijani footballer who currently plays Keşla as a midfielder. He is also a member of the Azerbaijan national football team and is considered to be one of the greatest Azerbaijani playmakers of all time.

Career
Imamverdiyev signed for Elazığspor on a one-year contract in September 2014.

On 4 May 2017, Imamverdiyev signed a one-year contract with Sumgayit FK.

On 12 July 2018, Imamverdiyev signed a three-year contract with Sabah FK.

On 30 June 2020, Imamverdiyev signed a one-year contract with Keşla FK.

Career statistics

Club

International

Statistics accurate as of match played 10 September 2018

International goals
Scores and results list Azerbaijan's goal tally first.

Honours
Neftchi Baku
Azerbaijan Premier League (3): 2010–11, 2011–12, 2012–13
Azerbaijan Cup (1): 2012–13

References

External links 
 

1990 births
Living people
Azerbaijani footballers
Azerbaijan international footballers
Azerbaijani expatriate footballers
Expatriate footballers in Turkey
Association football forwards
FK Karvan players
Elazığspor footballers
Sumgayit FK players
Sabah FC (Azerbaijan) players
Azerbaijan Premier League players
People from Shamkir
Neftçi PFK players
Shamakhi FK players